is a hack and slash video game set in China and the fifth installment in the Dynasty Warriors series, developed by Omega Force and published by Koei. The game was released on the PlayStation 2 and Xbox. It is based on the Chinese novel Romance of the Three Kingdoms by Luo Guanzhong.

Gameplay
The gameplay of Dynasty Warriors 5 is based on previous "Dynasty Warriors" games. It is a hack-and-slash beat-'em-up 3-D action game.

The game features multiple modes. Musou Mode presents a number of chronologically consecutive battle stages revolving around one chosen character, augmented by animation and character-voiced storytelling that provides context for battles and actions. Free Mode allows a player to play default levels and those that have been completed in Musou Mode one at a time. Both Musou Mode and Free Mode allow for two-player cooperative gameplay. Challenge Mode introduces a number of specialized stages with specific challenges, including time trials. 
In extreme mode you can buy many items. The Encyclopedia feature gives a description of each officer in Dynasty Warriors 5, including every non-player character. The Options feature stores viewed pre-rendered videos and offers gameplay and presentation options to the player.

The stronghold feature from Dynasty Warriors 4: Empires is also included in Dynasty Warriors 5. This aspect of gameplay introduces bases to the battlefield. Friendly bases may need protection, while defeating enemy bases earns bonuses to attack or defense or a musou and health-restoring item. Neutral bases can also be captured as strategic points.

Characters
* Denotes new characters to the series
Bold denotes characters available by default

Expansions

Dynasty Warriors 5: Xtreme Legends
Dynasty Warriors 5: Xtreme Legends (真・三國無双4: 猛将伝) is a minor expansion to Dynasty Warriors 5. This game was released on November 16, 2005 and is playable only on the PlayStation 2 video game console.

Dynasty Warriors 5: Xtreme Legends does not allow the player to play Musou Mode or Free Mode if the player does not possess the Dynasty Warriors 5 game disc. It brought back Xtreme Mode and Legend Mode from Dynasty Warriors 4: Xtreme Legends, and introduced Destiny Mode.

Xtreme Mode is a parallel to Shura Mode in Shin Sangokumusou 4: Special, in which the objective of the game is for the human-controlled character to survive as long as possible while collecting gold dropped by enemies to regain health and increase stats temporarily.

In Destiny Mode, the player creates a custom character before being asked to join the Kingdom of Shu, Wei and Wu. While in this mode, you start out as a basic soldier with very few attacks (starting off with only 2 fundamental hits) and will be "protected" by a chosen officer near the character. The officer will heal the character continuously when injured during battle, so long as the character is nearby. A unique feature of Destiny Mode is that at times the player is given the option to betray one force, while setting a ruse for another. For example, a player receives a letter from Cao Cao, the King of Wei, in which he asks the player to defect from the Kingdom of Wu to the Kingdom of Wei. If the player defers the offer to switch sides their commander may approach them in the hopes of creating a ruse to destroy the opposing force. If the player chooses to accept the option from their commander they will fight for the other side temporarily. When the time is right their original commander will have them move the opposing commander to a set position which will trigger their ruse and supporting units will ambush the opposing commander to support the player's defection.

Shin Sangokumusou 4: Special
Shin Sangokumusou 4: Special (真・三國無双4: Special) is another expansion to the game. This game was released on December 22, 2006 on the Xbox 360 and Microsoft Windows in Japan and shortly thereafter for Windows in Taiwan, and was not released outside Japan and Taiwan.

This version of the game is a combination of the original game and some Xtreme Legends features, including Legend Mode and Xtreme Mode. It does not include Edit Mode or Destiny Mode, but it does include the new items from Xtreme Legends. It includes gamepad support, allowing the user to use PlayStation 2 or Xbox 360-style controllers compatible with Windows.

The Windows version also has improved graphical features, such as real-time shadows.

Dynasty Warriors 5: Empires
Dynasty Warriors 5: Empires (真・三國無双4: Empires) is the second Dynasty Warriors Empires expansion by Omega Force of Koei. Dynasty Warriors 5: Empires was released on March 28, 2006 for both the PlayStation 2 and Xbox 360 video game consoles.

This game is focused upon strategy game play. In Empire Mode, which features five new stages not in Dynasty Warriors 5, the player initially enacts various policies within a chosen state by consulting with the state's officers and delegating responsibilities to others. Battle tactics can be discussed, a feature of other titles in the strategy genre, such as Romance of the Three Kingdoms.

Other than Empire Mode, new items and weapons are introduced. Another new feature is the ability of being able to order non player officers to group, attack, or defend certain areas of the battlefield and choose which specific officer you wish to carry out these feats. Time limits can also be altered to fit your needs, also special tactics can be used to turn the tides of battle.

In addition to the original Dynasty Warriors 5 soundtrack, this expansion adds soundtracks from previous titles, including Dynasty Warriors 2, Dynasty Warriors 3 and Dynasty Warriors 4.

The Dynasty Warriors Empires expansion is the only expansion where players can play as "minor" officers, that did not originally have their own storyline in any of the previous Dynasty Warriors games. These officers also do not have their own "skin", but there are several group skins for them (in the same battle, officers of the same skin group look identical). In every other Dynasty Warriors game, minor officers are NPCs.

Stages
Many of the stages are recreations of notable battles present historically or from the novel Romance of the Three Kingdoms, while original creations became more common with the newer installments.

Trading Card Game
Koei published a series of trading card game (「真・三國無双 4」トレーディングカードゲーム) based on Dynasty Warriors 5 in 2005-7-29. The cards are illustrated by Hiroyuki Suwahara. Starter box (53 cards) cost 1500 yen, while booster pack (10 cards) cost 280 yen.

Available starter box including Wei set, Wu set, Shu set.

There are total 266 cards in the game, including 36 commander, 160 general, 35 strategy, 15 trap, 20 item. Booster pack include 10 cards from the set of 266.

Reception

Dynasty Warriors 5 received "average" reviews according to video game review aggregator Metacritic.

Xtreme Legends

Dynasty Warriors 5: Xtreme Legends received "mixed" reviews according to video game review aggregator Metacritic.

Empires

Dynasty Warriors 5: Empires received "mixed" reviews according to video game review aggregator Metacritic.  In Japan, Famitsu gave it a score of one nine, two eights, and one nine for the Xbox 360 version, and all four eights for the PS2 version.

References

External links
Koei's Official site
Dynasty Warriors 5 (YouTube)

2005 video games
Dynasty Warriors
PlayStation 2 games
PlayStation Network games
Koei games
Xbox 360 games
Xbox games
Windows games
Multiplayer and single-player video games
Crowd-combat fighting games
Video games developed in Japan
Video games set in China
Video games based on Chinese mythology